The 1903 British Columbia general election was the tenth general election for the Province of British Columbia, Canada. It was held to elect members of the Legislative Assembly of British Columbia. The election was called on September 5, 1903, and held on October 3, 1903. The new legislature met for the first time on November 26, 1903.

This was the first election in British Columbia that was fought by political parties. Prior to this election, British Columbia politics were non-partisan.

The first election was dominated by the Conservative and Liberal parties, which were affiliated with existing parties at the federal level. See Conservative Party of Canada and Liberal Party of Canada.

The Conservative Party won over 46.4% of the popular vote and a slim majority of the seats in the legislature.

Unlike in the previous BC general election, in 1903 of the 42 MLAs 31 were elected in single member districts. There were also one 2-member districts and one 4-member district and one 5-member district. Each voter could cast as many votes as there were seats to fill in the district.

Results by party

Notes:

* Party did not nominate candidates in the previous election.

1 The Conservative Party and the Liberal Party each elected one candidate by acclamation.

2 There was no provincial "Labour Party" as such. Each of the three Electoral Districts with a Labour candidate (Nanaimo, Slocan, and Vancouver City) had a local, autonomous Labour Party. As well, some Liberal candidates appear to have run on a "Liberal-Labour" platform (Atlin, Victoria and Ymir).

Results by riding

|-
||    
|align="center"|Henry Esson Young
|align="center"  |AtlinConservative
||    
||    
|align="center"  |AlberniLiberal
|align="center"|William Wallace Burns McInnes
||    
|-
||    
|align="center"|Robert Grant
|align="center"  |ComoxConservative
||    
||    
|align="center"  |CaribooLiberal
|align="center"|Harry Jones
||    
|-
||    
|align="center"|Richard McBride1
|align="center"  |DewdneyConservative
||    
||    
|align="center"  |CaribooLiberal
|align="center"|James Murphy
||    
|-
||    
|align="center"|Charles Edward Pooley
|align="center"  |EsquimaltConservative
||    
||    
|align="center"  |ChilliwhackLiberal
|align="center"|Charles William Munro
||    
|-
||    
|align="center"|William Roderick Ross
|align="center"  |FernieConservative
||    
||    
|align="center"  |ColumbiaLiberal
|align="center"|Wilmer Cleveland Wells
||    
|-
||    
|align="center"|George Arthur Fraser
|align="center"  |Grand ForksConservative
||    
||    
|align="center"  |CowichanLiberal
|align="center"|John Newell Evans
||    
|-
||    
|align="center"|Frederick John Fulton
|align="center"  |KamloopsConservative
||    
||    
|align="center"  |CranbrookLiberal
|align="center"|James Horace King
||    
|-
||    
|align="center"|Robert Francis Green
|align="center"  |KasloConservative
||    
||    
|align="center"  |DeltaLiberal
|align="center"|John Oliver
||    
|-
||    
|align="center"|John Houston
|align="center"  |Nelson CityConservative
||    
||    
|align="center"  |GreenwoodLiberal
|align="center"|John Robert Brown
||    
|-
||    
|align="center"|Thomas Gifford
|align="center"  |New Westminster CityConservative
||    
||    
|align="center"  |The IslandsLiberal
|align="center"|Thomas Wilson Paterson
||    
|-
||    
|align="center"|Price Ellison
|align="center"  |OkanaganConservative
||    
||    
|align="center"  |Rossland CityLiberal
|align="center"|James Alexander MacDonald2
||    
|-
||    
|align="center"|Thomas Taylor
|align="center"  |RevelstokeConservative
||    
||    
|align="center"  |SaanichLiberal
|align="center"|Henry Ernest Tanner
||    
|-
||    
|align="center"|Francis Lovett Carter-Cotton
|align="center"  |RichmondConservative
||    
||    
|align="center" rowspan=4 |Victoria CityLiberal
|align="center"|William George Cameron
||    
|-
||    
|align="center"|Lytton Wilmot Shatford
|align="center"  |SimilkameenConservative
||    
||    
|align="center"|Robert Low Drury
||    
|-
||    
|align="center"|Charles William Digby Clifford
|align="center"  |SkeenaConservative
||    
||    
|align="center"|Richard Hall
||    
|-
||    
|align="center"|Charles William John Bowser
|align="center" rowspan=5 |Vancouver CityConservative
||    
||    
|align="center"|James Dugald McNiven
||    
|-
||    
|align="center"|James Ford Garden
||    
||    
|align="center"  |YaleLiberal
|align="center"|Stuart Alexander Henderson
||    
|-
|-
||    
|align="center"|Alexander Henry Boswell MacGowan
||    
||    
|align="center"  |Nanaimo CitySocialist
|align="center"|James Hurst Hawthornthwaite
||    
|-
||    
|align="center"|Robert Garnett Tatlow
||    
||    
|align="center"  |NewcastleSocialist
|align="center"|Parker Williams
||    
|-
||    
|align="center"|Charles Wilson
||    
||    
|align="center"  |SlocanLabour
|align="center"|William Davidson
||    
|-
|-
||    
|align="center"|Harry Wright
|align="center"  |YmirConservative
||    
|
|align="center"  |
|align="center"|
|-
|
|align="center"|1  Premier-Elect
|-
|
|
|align="center"|2  Leader of the Opposition
|-
| align="center" colspan="10"|Source: Elections BC
|-
|}

See also
List of British Columbia political parties

Further reading & references

In the Sea of Sterile Mountains: The Chinese in British Columbia, Joseph Morton, J.J. Douglas, Vancouver (1974).  Despite its title, a fairly thorough account of the politicians and electoral politics in early BC.

References

1903
1903 elections in Canada
1903 in British Columbia
October 1903 events